Set Free is a 1918 American silent comedy film directed by Tod Browning. It is not known whether the film currently survives, which suggests that it is a lost film.

Plot
After discovering that her grandmother was a gypsy, Roma Wycliffe leaves her old- money life with her Aunt Henrietta, and goes to New York City to live as a gypsy.

Once she arrives in New York, Roma is mistaken for a thief and arrested.  The kindly and rich woman Mrs. Roberts volunteers to take her under her wing to prevent her from going to jail.  Her son John Roberts falls in love with Roma.  Roma does not return his feelings, because his rich life style is a far cry from the freedom of gypsy life.  John hires a group of street thugs to pretend to be his gypsy crew.  The “gypsies” take their new role as gypsy thieves too far and start robbing a bank.  John turns them in to the authorities. John and Roma agree to marry.

Cast
 Edith Roberts as Roma Wycliffe
 Harry Hilliard as John Roberts
 Harold Goodwin as Ronald Blair
 Mollie McConnell as Mrs. Roberts (credited as Molly McConnell)

References

External links

1918 films
American silent feature films
American black-and-white films
1918 comedy films
Films directed by Tod Browning
Universal Pictures films
Silent American comedy films
Films with screenplays by Joseph F. Poland
Films set in New York City
Films about Romani people
1910s American films
1910s English-language films